For mobile telecommunications, the Charging Data Record (CDR) is, in 3GPP parlance, a formatted collection of information about a chargeable telecommunication event (making a phone call, using the Internet from your mobile device).

CDRs are used for user billing: a telecom provider transfers them from time to time in order to send bills to their users. CDRs are sent in  GTP' messages, or saved in files and fetched with FTP protocol.

Information on chargeable events includes time of call set-up, duration of the call, amount of data transferred, etc. A separate CDR is generated for each party to be charged.

Entries on CDRs use a {category, usage} syntax. Usage units can be bits (e.g. user downloaded a 1MB movie), seconds (e.g. user downloaded 1 minute of a movie), or other units (e.g. user downloaded 1 movie).

CDR type 
CDRs can be classified basically on two parameters
 The node at which they're generated: GGSN, SGSN, PGW, SGW, etc.
 The kind of service or activity they're charging : MBMS, Mobility, Location request etc.
As per the specifications the records are classified as follows :
 S-CDR
 SGW-CDR
 PGW-CDR
 eG-CDR
 M-CDR
 S-SMO-CDR
 LCS-MO-CDR
 LCS-NI-CDR
 S-MB-CDR
 G-MB-CDR
 MBMS-GW-CDR

See also
 Call detail record, the counterpart for Circuit Switch service usage. Also abbreviated as CDR.

References

External links
 3GPP TS 32.240: Charging architecture and principles
 3GPP TS 32.295: Charging Data Record (CDR) transfer
 3GPP TS 32.297: Charging Data Record (CDR) file format and transfer
 3GPP TS 32.298: Charging Data Record (CDR) parameter description

3GPP standards
Mobile telecommunications standards
it:Cartellino di traffico